Crinipellis rhizomaticola is a species of fungus in the family Marasmiaceae. Found in Korea, where it grows in open woodland with Japanese red pine (Pinus densiflora), the fungus was described as a new species in 2009.

References

External links

Fungal plant pathogens and diseases
Marasmiaceae
Fungi described in 2009